Lensman: Secret of the Lens, known in Japan as , is a 1984 Japanese animated film based on the Lensman novels by E. E. Smith. Most of the CGI sequences were created by the Japan Computer Graphics Lab (JCGL). It was dubbed into English and released in the United States in 1990.

Plot
The story is about a farm boy named Kimball "Kim" Kinnison. From a dying Lensman of the Galactic Patrol, Kinnison receives a particular Lens. It contains information that would enable the Galactic Patrol to face a weapon created by the Boskone Empire. A non-human species, the Arisians, created the Lenses in order to stand up to the evil Eddorians. Through their Lenses, Lensman minds are merged with the cosmic consciousness of Arisia. Opposing the Patrol is Lord Helmuth, a Boskone leader and drug lord, who would stop at nothing to get his hands on the Lens.

The Boskone blow up the agricultural planet Mqueie where Kim lives with his father, Gary ("Ken" in the Harmony Gold dub). Now a humble farmer, Gary is one of the founders of the Galactic Patrol. If he hadn't lost an arm in battle, Gary would have been a Lensman himself. Having always dreamt of becoming a Lensman, Gary sacrifices his own life to secure Kim's escape from the pursuing Boskone fleet.

Kim escapes the Boskone with his horned and bearded near-human friend Van Buskirk. Through the movie's events, Kim also meets Clarissa MacDougall, a nurse and technician working with the Galactic Patrol. Like Gary, she cannot explain how the Lens could be transferred from the dying man to Kim.

Through the tutelage of a flying alien green dragon hero named Worsel, Kim gradually realizes the Lens's power, which provides the key to Helmuth's defeat. He transmits the formula to the Galactic Patrol fleet, knowing that their planned attack against Helmuth would fail without the answer.

Voice cast

Reception
The movie received a mixed reception.

The GURPS supplement for Lensman references the film.

References

External links
 
 
 Lensman (SF Shinseki Lensman) at Moria.co.nz

1984 anime films
Adventure anime and manga
Films based on American novels
1980s Japanese-language films
American animated science fiction films
Lensman series
Tatsunoko Production
Madhouse (company)
Science fiction anime and manga
Toho animated films
1984 directorial debut films
1984 films
Films directed by Yoshiaki Kawajiri
1980s American films